Cedarmont is a two-story brick house in Williamson County, Tennessee, near Franklin, that was listed on the National Register of Historic Places in 1984.

It was deemed "a fine example of Middle Tennessee's early brick vernacular farmhouse with added Greek Revival detailing." The main portion of the house was built c.1816 and a two-story "T-plan" addition was added in c.1855.

It includes Greek Revival architecture.

References

Houses on the National Register of Historic Places in Tennessee
Houses in Franklin, Tennessee
Greek Revival houses in Tennessee
Houses completed in 1816
1816 establishments in Tennessee
National Register of Historic Places in Williamson County, Tennessee